Game Changer Wrestling (GCW), formerly known as Jersey Championship Wrestling (JCW), is an American independent professional wrestling promotion based in New Jersey. The promotion was originally founded by Ricky Otazu in 1999, it was rebranded under its current name in 2015, after a sale to Danny Demanto and current owner Brett Lauderdale. The promotion specializes in hardcore wrestling, as well as mixed martial arts-inspired shoot style matches.

GCW has since grown from running shows based in New Jersey, to holding events across the United States, as well as internationally in Japan and Mexico. Annual events include Backyard Wrestling, Bloodsport, Joey Janela's Spring Break, the Nick Gage Invitational, and the Tournament of Survival.

History

As Jersey Championship Wrestling
Jersey Championship Wrestling (JCW) was founded by independent wrestler Ricky Otazu, also known by his ring name of Ricky O, in January 1999 in New Jersey. JCW ran their first show on January 29, 2000, in Lyndhurst, New Jersey. Later that year, JCW hosted the inaugural Jersey J-Cup, which featured many of the top independent wrestlers of that period. They would continue to host the tournament until 2004, when JCW was sold to rival company National Wrestling Superstars (NWS).

The promotion would remain dormant for nearly a decade until September 2013 when, after the closure of National Wrestling Superstars, Otazu reclaimed the rights to JCW and reopened the promotion. In April 2014, JCW opened its own training school in North Bergen. Later that year, JCW would return to hosting the Jersey J-Cup.

2015–present: Rebranding as Game Changer Wrestling
In June 2015, Jersey Championship Wrestling rebranded itself to Game Changer Wrestling (GCW) after being purchased by Brett Lauderdale and Danny Demanto. Since the buyout, GCW began to predominantly feature hardcore wrestling and continued to enjoy success in the New Jersey wrestling scene. GCW became known for producing several tournaments featuring independent wrestlers; including the Nick Gage Invitational Ultraviolent Tournament, the Tournament of Survival and the Acid Cup.

In March 2017, GCW produced Joey Janela's Spring Break show in Fern Park, Florida. This would become an annual tradition for the company. GCW would begin to expand throughout the United States and hosted its first show in Los Angeles in November 2018, titled To Live and Die in LA. In April 2018, GCW partnered with Matt Riddle to produce Matt Riddle's Bloodsport, a show that fused professional wrestling and mixed martial arts. Bloodsport would take place twice more in 2019, this time with the partnership of Josh Barnett. In August 2019, GCW embarked on a two-day tour of Japan.

In December 2020, GCW attempted to end their partnership with streaming platform Independent Wrestling TV (IWTV), later moving their content to FITE TV. In 2021, IWTV sued GCW for breach of contract.

On January 23, 2022, GCW held the sold out The Wrld on GCW event, their debut at the Hammerstein Ballroom. The event marked the first GCW event to air on traditional pay-per-view outlets.

On February 7, 2022, GCW signed Nick Gage to a contract, which was referred to as "the first and only contract that GCW will offer". GCW owner Brett Lauderdale said of the contract, "This is a major milestone moment for both Nick and GCW. I have always been against the idea of contracts in GCW but there are exceptions to every rule. From day 1, Nick has put his body, and literally his life on the line for the fans inside the squared circle. He deserves, and has earned the right to be rewarded for 20+ years of hard work and sacrifice. This historic contract will do just that, allowing him to continue his in-ring career at a pace that is beneficial to his health, while beginning to focus on opportunities that take him towards the next phase of his career. GCW would not have achieved the level of success it has without Nick F'N Gage, and we are proud to be able to say that GCW will remain Nick's home for the rest of his career".

Roster

Game Changer Wrestling's roster consists mainly of independent freelancers.

Wrestlers

Other personnel

Championships and accomplishments

Current championship 

Former championships

Championship history

GCW Extreme Championship

Combined reigns

GCW Ultraviolent Championship

Reigns

Combined reigns

JCW World Championship

Jersey J-Cup Tournament (2023)

Reigns

References

External links

Game Changer Wrestling on YouTube
Fite TV page

American professional wrestling promotions
American independent professional wrestling promotions based in New Jersey
American companies established in 1999